The 2015–16 season was Villarreal Club de Fútbol's 93rd season in existence and the club's 3rd consecutive season in the top flight of Spanish football. In addition to the domestic league, Villarreal participated in this season's editions of the Copa del Rey and the UEFA Europa League. The season covered the period from 1 July 2015 to 30 June 2016.

Players

Current squad

Out on loan

Competitions

Overall record

La Liga

League table

Results summary

Results by round

Matches

Copa del Rey

Round of 32

Round of 16

UEFA Europa League

Group stage

Knockout phase

Round of 32

Round of 16

Quarter-finals

Semi-finals

Statistics

Appearances and goals
Last updated on 15 May 2016

|-
! colspan=14 style=background:#dcdcdc; text-align:center|Goalkeepers

|-
! colspan=14 style=background:#dcdcdc; text-align:center|Defenders

|-
! colspan=14 style=background:#dcdcdc; text-align:center|Midfielders

|-
! colspan=14 style=background:#dcdcdc; text-align:center|Forwards

|-
! colspan=14 style=background:#dcdcdc; text-align:center| Players who have made an appearance or had a squad number this season but have left the club

|}

See also
2015–16 La Liga

References

Villarreal CF seasons
Villarreal CF
Villarreal CF